was the eldest son of one of the most famous figures in Japanese history, Prince Shōtoku. Yamashiro claimed the right to Imperial succession in 628, following the death of Empress Suiko. However, he lost the claim to Prince Tamura who ascended to the throne as Emperor Jomei, having enjoyed the support of powerful court noble Soga no Emishi.

He and his family committed suicide when their home was attacked by Emishi's son, Soga no Iruka, in 643. Some scholars believe Yamashiro to have been the poet-scholar Sarumaru no Taifu, about whom nearly nothing is known.

References

643 deaths
Japanese princes
People of Asuka-period Japan
Year of birth unknown